The 2022 ECCO FEI World Championships were held in Herning, Denmark. It was the ninth edition of the Games, which are held every four years and run by the International Federation for Equestrian Sports (FEI). For team events in the dressage and show jumping disciplines, these Games were the first qualifying event for the 2024 Summer Olympics.

Venues and disciplines
Competition venues in at the Messecenter Herning hosted the following disciplines:
 Herning
 Stutteri Ask Stadium – Jumping, Dressage
 BB Horse Arena – Para-equestrian Dressage, international youth classes in dressage, show-jumping
 Jyske Bank Boxen – Vaulting, side-events

Schedule
All times are Central European Summer Time (UTC+2)

Dressage

Jumping

Vaulting

Para-Dressage

Officials
Appointment of (Olympic disciplines) officials is as follows:

Jumping
  Carsten Andre Soerlie (Ground Jury President)
  Patrice Alvado  (Ground Jury Member)
  Jens Hellmers (Ground Jury Member)
  David Distler (Ground Jury Member)
  Anna Lindqvist (Ground Jury Member)
  Bruno Laubscher (Ground Jury Member)
  Antony D’Ambrosio (FEI Technical Delegate)

Dressage
  Susanne Baarup (Ground Jury President)
  Peter Storr (Ground Jury Member)
  Mariëtte Sanders van Gansewinkel (Ground Jury Member)
  Elke Ebert (Ground Jury Member)
  Christof Umbach (Ground Jury Member)  
  Anne Gribbons (Ground Jury Member)
  Raphaël Saleh (Ground Jury Member)
  Janet Foy (FEI Technical Delegate)
  Magnus Ringmark (Reserve member)

Para-Dressage
  Marco Orsini (Ground Jury President)
  Kathrine Lucheschi (Ground Jury Member)
  Sue Cunningham (Ground Jury Member)
  John Robinson (Ground Jury Member)
  Jeannette Wolfs (Ground Jury Member)  
  Kristi Wysocki (Ground Jury Member)
  Kjell Myhre (Ground Jury Member)
  Jan Holger Holtschmidt (FEI Technical Delegate)
  Marc Urban (Reserve Member)

Participating nations
49 nations are scheduled to take part.

  Argentina (13)
  Armenia (1)
  Australia (20)
  Austria (27)
  Belgium (14)
  Brazil (19)
  Canada (13)
  China (1)
  Colombia (8)
  Czech Republic (4)
  Denmark (23)
  Dominican Republic (1)
  Egypt (2)
  Estonia (1)
  Finland (15)
  France (20)
  Germany (28)
  Great Britain (21)
  Greece (3)
  Hungary (5)
  India (2)
  Ireland (13)
  Israel (3)
  Italy (14)
  Japan (11)
  Jordan (2)
  Latvia (3)
  Lebanon (1)
  Lithuania (2)
  Luxembourg (2)
  Mexico (6)
  Moldova (1)
  Morocco (1)
  Netherlands (25)
  New Zealand (3)
  Norway (12)
  Palestine (1)
  Poland (10)
  Portugal (6)
  Saudi Arabia (1)
  Singapore (2)
  Slovakia (1)
  South Africa (2)
  Spain (20)
  Sweden (21)
  Switzerland (21)
  Turkey (2)
  United States (26)
  Virgin Islands (1)

Medal summary

Medalists

Medal table

References

External links
LiveStream on ClipMyHorse.TV
FEI website
2022 World Equestrian Games official site

FEI World Equestrian Games
2022 in Danish sport
Equestrian sports competitions in Denmark
International sports competitions hosted by Denmark
FEI World Equestrian Games
Para Dressage
World Equestrian Games